"The Little Old Log Cabin In The Lane" is a popular song written by Will S. Hays in 1871 for the minstrel trade. Written in dialect, the song tells of an elderly man, presumably a slave or former slave, passing his later years in a broken-down old log cabin. The title is from a refrain: "de little old log cabin in de lane".

The Ballad Index by Robert B. Waltz and David G. Engle lists more than 20 recordings of the song from 1903 to 1940. 

The Metropolitan Quartet recorded the harmonized sentimental minstrel version in 1918, which has been digitized for online listening at the University of California at Santa Barbara.. 

Performers modified the lyric over the years, eliminating Hays' "darky" dialect along with the original reference to slavery.  For example, the "old master and mistress" became the narrator's parents in mid-20th century Bluegrass versions.

The song itself was popular, resulting in several answer songs, but the melody was even more widely used, including songs set in the cowboy West: Western songs such as "The Little Old Sod Shanty on the Claim" and "Little Joe, The Wrangler"; railroad songs, "Little Red Caboose Behind The Train"; and even hymns, "The Lily of the Valley".

Fiddlin' John Carson's recording of "The Little Old Log Cabin In The Lane" was one of the first commercial recordings by a rural white musician. Its popularity ensured that the industry would continue recording rural folk songs. The only known recording of banjo player Uncle John Scruggs was a newsreel film performance of this song.

Lyrics

References

Bibliography
Carlin, Richard. Country Music: A Biographical Dictionary. New York: Routledge (2002).
 Thorp, N. Howard "Jack". Songs of the Cowboys. Houghton Mifflin Company, 1908, 1921.
Waltz, Robert B; David G. Engle. "Little Old Log Cabin in the Lane". The Traditional Ballad Index: An Annotated Bibliography of the Folk Songs of the English-Speaking World. Hosted by California State University, Fresno, Folklore, 2007.

American folk songs
Bluegrass songs
Grammy Hall of Fame Award recipients
1871 songs
1923 singles
.